Elephant Family is an international NGO dedicated to protecting the Asian elephant from extinction in the wild. In the last fifty years their population has roughly halved and 90% of their habitat has disappeared. Poaching, a growing skin trade, and demand for wild-caught calves for tourism remain a constant threat along with the deadly and escalating conflict between people and elephants for living space and food. Elephant Family funds pioneering projects across Asia to reconnect forest fragments, prevent conflict and fight wildlife crime. Since 2002 Elephant Family has funded over 170 conservation projects and raised over £10m through public art events for this iconic yet endangered animal.

The late Mark Shand was one of the founding forces behind the charity when it launched in 2002 under the patronage of the Rajmata of Jaipur and Sir Evelyn de Rothschild. Mark Shand was an adventurer, best-selling author and conservationist who dedicated his life to the survival of the Asian elephant. His mission started in 1988 when he rescued a street begging elephant, which he named Tara, and journeyed 800km across India with her. Tara became the star of Mark’s best-selling book, Travels on my Elephant, which went on to win him Travel Writer of the Year.

King Charles III and his wife Queen Camilla are joint royal presidents of the charity and most recently attended launched Elephant Parade India for the charity during their visit to Delhi.

Elephant Family is known for its award winning creative events that have raised millions for Asian elephants including The Fabergé Egg Hunt in 2012 and 2014, Travels to my Elephant in 2015 and 2017, The Animal Ball in 2013 and 2016, and Elephant Parade London 2010 and India 2018.

Leaders
Mark Shand – chairman (2009–2014; his death)
Ruth Powys – principal trustee

Partnership 
Elephant Family partner with local NGOs across Asia to raise local awareness and to support sustainable in-a country conservation projects. 

The NGOs include: 
Asian Elephant Specialist Group
Cambodia Elephant Conservation Group
Compass Films
Danau Girang Field Centre
Elephant Conservation Network
Fauna & Flora International
Grow Back for Posterity
Hutan
IFAW
IUCNI
Nature Conservation Foundation
The DodoBase
The Golden Triangle Asian Elephant Foundation
Vesswic
Veterinary Society for Sumatran Wildlife Conservation
Wildlife Conservation Society
Wildlife Protection Society of India
Wildlife Trust of India
World Land Trust
Wildlife Society of Odisha

Royal presidents
King Charles III and Queen Camilla

References

External links 
 
 

Animal charities based in the United Kingdom
Charities based in London
Organizations established in 2002